All Together Now is an Italian reality television music competition hosted by Michelle Hunziker, based on the reality television singing competition format of the same name.

Summary

Season 1 (2019)

Episode 1 
First heat

Second heat

Last sing-off

Episode 2
First heat

Second heat;

Last sing-off

Episode 3
First heat

Second heat

Last sing-off

Episode 4
First heat

Second heat

Last sing-off

Semifinal

Final
First heat

Second heat

Duets

Super final

The 100
Members of the 100 include:

Ratings

Season 2 (2019-2020)

Episode 1

Episode 2

Episode 3

Semifinal

Final

The 100
Members of the 100 include:

Ratings

Season 3 (2020)

Episode 1

Episode 2

Episode 3

Episode 4

Semifinal

Final

The 100 
Members of the 100 include:

Ratings

Season 4 (2021)

Episode 1

Episode 2

Episode 3

Episode 4

Episode 5

Episode 6

Semifinal

Final

The 100 
Members of the 100 include:

Ratings

Notes

References 

Television series by Endemol
Italian-language television shows
Singing talent shows
All Together Now (franchise)
Italian television series based on British television series
Canale 5 original programming